The synagogue of Baden is an Orthodox Ashkenazi-rite synagogue in the city of Baden in the canton of Aargau, Switzerland. It was built in 1912–1913 and is now listed among the Cultural Property of National Significance.

History
The construction of a synagogue in Baden was projected in 1904. In December 1911, the Jewish community of Baden acquired a plot at Parkstrasse 17, in front of today's Grand Casino Baden, for 23,000 francs. Several architects offered to design the building. Eventually, the synagogue was designed by Badener architect Otto Dorer (1851–1920) and his collaborator Adolf Füchslin (1850–1925). It has large semi-circular windows and a richly adorned interior. The synagogue was consecrated on September 2, 1913.

In 1931, around Yom Kippur, the façade of the synagogue was sprayed with swastikas.

See also
History of the Jews in Switzerland
List of cultural property of national significance in Switzerland: Aargau

References

20th-century establishments in Switzerland
20th-century synagogues
Ashkenazi Jewish culture in Switzerland
Ashkenazi synagogues
Baden, Switzerland
Buildings and structures completed in 1913
Cultural property of national significance in Aargau
Orthodox Judaism in Switzerland
Orthodox synagogues
Synagogues in Switzerland
20th-century architecture in Switzerland